The Forest Rugby Club was established in 1958, to serve the community, not only as a rugby club but also to assist in the development of the youth in The Forest area. The club has grown dramatically since its inception and now fields junior teams from U6's to U17's.

The senior club has become one of NSW strongest and now fields 6 senior teams in the NSW Suburban Rugby Union 1st Division Kentwell Cup. The Kentwell Cup is the second tier of club Rugby and is a Sydney wide competition.

History
In 1957 the Forest Rugby story began when a small group of men from the Frenchs Forest area, who used to meet for a drink after work in a Chatswood Hotel, decided they would like their sons to play rugby. As there was no organised rugby in the area, one of the fathers Bill Holmes, formed a team of boys to enter the Gordon, Northern Districts competition. The team was coached by Dick Healy and managed by Bill Holmes and Les Cowan.

By 1958 the number of players, officials and supporters increased and it was decided to form a club. The first meeting was held in Soldiers Hall, Forestville on 10 February 1958. The club's colours of Bottle Green and White were chosen. The home ground would be French's Forest Primary School Oval.

Throughout the 60's the club progressed further by drafting and having accepted a constitution, increasing their junior teams to 14 and re-locating to the permanent home ground of The War Memorial Playing Fields, Melwood Oval, Forestville. Notably, in 1966 the club's numbers had grown to 300 with 16 teams being fielded and Peter Sullivan being the first player from the club to be selected to play for NSW (and later went on to captain Australia).

In 1972 the club entered its first team in the Sydney Sub-District Competition where they stayed until 1979 where they were invited to join the newly formed 3rd Division. After several years of playing in the higher division it was decided to return to Sub-District competition in 1982 after difficulty fielding teams in all 4 grades due to the vast amount of traveling involved.

The club has been a centre of community activity throughout the 80's, 90's and into the millennium staging junior rugby training camps, golden oldies tournaments and fierce and competitive local rugby.

Honours
 NSW Suburban Club of the Year: 1998

1st Division
 Sutherland Cup (5th Grade): 2000

2nd Division
 Club Championship: 1989, 1998, 2019
 Barraclough Cup (1st Grade): 1978, 1996, 1998, 2015, 2019
 Stockdale Cup (2nd Grade): 1976, 1988, 1989, 1995, 1997, 1998, 2015, 2018
 Blunt Cup (3rd Grade): 1987, 1995, 1998
 Halligan Cup (5th Grade): 1998
 Robertson Cup (Colts): 2019

3rd division
 Club Championship: 1983, 1984
 McClean Cup (1st Grade): 1983, 1984
 Grose Cup (2nd Grade): 1984

Colts
 Sydney Colts Competition (2nd Division): 1980

Honour Board

Life Members
 1969 - W Holmes
 1972 - C Ferguson
 1973 - H Derwin
 1975 - Dave Powell
 1980 - G Hough
 1982 - Ron Hughes
 1990 - Dudley Barter
 1991 - Barry Sullivan
 1994 - David Dickerson
 1999 - Alan Astley
 2000 - Martyn Penny
 2004 - Mick Herringe

Presidents
 1959 - 60: W Holmes
 1961 - 62: B MacKenzie
 1963 - 64: C Ferguson
 1965 - 65: R Oldland
 1966 - 68: H Derwin
 1969 - 71: D Powell
 1972 - 75: G Hough
 1976 - 77: N Brown
 1978 - 79: J Goddard
 1980 - 83: R Hughes
 1984 - 85: B Manuel
 1986 - 87: G Armstrong
 1988 - 95: D Dickerson
 1996 - 00: M Penny
 2001 - 03: S Tiatia
 2004 - 05: S Ledbury
 2006 - 08: G Allan
 2009 - 10: D McAndrew
 2011 - 18: D Dickerson
 2019 - Current: M Driessen

See also
New South Wales Suburban Rugby Union
New South Wales Rugby Union
Australian Rugby Union
Rugby union in Australia

External links
NSW Subbies website
Rugby Heaven website

Rugby union teams in Sydney
Rugby clubs established in 1958
1958 establishments in Australia
Frenchs Forest, New South Wales